Athletes from the Federal People's Republic of Yugoslavia competed at the 1960 Summer Olympics in Rome, Italy. 116 competitors, 107 men and 9 women, took part in 64 events in 14 sports.

Yugoslavia had won silver medals in Men's Football (Soccer) for the past 3 Summer Games and finally won gold in Rome.

Medalists

Athletics

Men's Marathon
 Franjo Škrinjar 
 → 2:21.40 (10th place)
 Franjo Mihalić 
 → 2:21:52 (12th place)

Basketball

Boxing

Canoeing

Cycling

Five male cyclists represented Yugoslavia in 1960.

Individual road race
 Janez Žirovnik
 Ivan Levačić
 Nevenko Valčić
 Alojz Bajc

Team time trial
 Ivan Levačić
 Veselin Petrović
 Janez Žirovnik
 Nevenko Valčić

Fencing

Two fencers, one man and one woman, represented Yugoslavia in 1960.

Men's sabre
 Aleksandar Vasin

Women's foil
 Vera Jeftimijades

Football

Gymnastics

Rowing

Yugoslavia had 12 male rowers participate in four out of seven rowing events in 1960.

 Men's double sculls
 Joža Lovec
 Perica Vlašić

 Men's coxless pair
 Nikola Čupin
 Antun Ivanković

 Men's coxed pair
 Paško Škarica
 Ante Vrčić
 Josip Bujas (cox)

 Men's coxed four
 Vladimir Nekora
 Janez Pintar
 Adolf Potočar
 Vekoslav Skalak
 Nikola Stipanicev (cox)

Sailing

Shooting

Six shooters represented Yugoslavia in 1960.

50 m pistol
 Karlo Umek
 Ilija Ničić

300 m rifle, three positions
 Josip Ćuk
 Vladimir Grozdanović

50 m rifle, three positions
 Miroslav Stojanović
 Branislav Lončar

50 m rifle, prone
 Miroslav Stojanović
 Josip Ćuk

Swimming

Water polo

Wrestling

References

External links
Official Olympic Reports
International Olympic Committee results database

Nations at the 1960 Summer Olympics
1960
Summer Olympics